= Ohio Philosophical Association =

The Ohio Philosophical Association is a philosophical organization founded in 1931 in Ohio. For many years, it was affiliated with the Ohio College Association, which was founded in 1867. The purpose of the Ohio Philosophical Association is to encourage “research in philosophy and the interchange of ideas among teachers in philosophy in the colleges and universities of Ohio.”

Its presidents include the following individuals:

- 2002-2003: John Bender, Ohio University
- 2003-2005: Deb Smith, Kent State University
- 2005-2007: Mark LeBar, Ohio University
- 2007-2009: Michael Byron, Kent State University
- 2009-2011: Errol Katayama, Ohio Northern University
- 2011-2013: Pat Croskery, Ohio Northern University
- 2013-2015: Andrew P. Mills, Otterbein University
- 2015-2017: Priscilla Sakezles, The University of Akron
- 2017-2019: John Rudisill, The College of Wooster
- 2019-2022: Kelly Coble, Baldwin Wallace University
- 2022-2024: Dimitria Gatzia, The University of Akron
- 2024-2026: Christopher Pincock, The Ohio State University
